The discography of Dream Theater, an American progressive metal band, consists of fifteen studio albums, one extended play, nine live albums, one compilation album, eight video albums, nine singles, and twenty-one music videos. The band was formed under the name Majesty by guitarist John Petrucci, bassist John Myung, and drummer Mike Portnoy while the three of them were attending Berklee College of Music in September 1985. The trio added keyboard player Kevin Moore and vocalist Chris Collins in order to complete their lineup. After the band released a demo entitled The Majesty Demos, Collins was replaced by Charlie Dominici in November 1987.

The group signed with Mechanic Records, and released its debut album When Dream and Day Unite in 1989. Before the album's release the group agreed to change their name to "Dream Theater", inspired by a now-demolished California movie theater. After firing Dominici, Dream Theater hired Canadian vocalist James LaBrie in 1991. LaBrie's debut album was Images and Words, which was the band's first and only gold-certified album by the Recording Industry Association of America (RIAA), having sold more than 500,000 copies. Moore left the group after the recording of 1994's Awake and was replaced by Derek Sherinian for the album's tour—he was later hired as a full member, appearing on the EP A Change of Seasons and the full album Falling Into Infinity. The double live album Once in a Livetime was released in 1998.

In 1999, Jordan Rudess was hired to replace Sherinian. Rudess's first work was Scenes from a Memory, a concept album that followed the story of a murder mystery. In 2002, the group released Six Degrees of Inner Turbulence, followed by Train of Thought in 2003, and Octavarium in 2005. Two more live albums were also released in this time period, and a new one, titled Score, was released for the band's 20th anniversary and featured the band backed by a 29-piece orchestra. It was followed a year later by their ninth studio album, Systematic Chaos. Dream Theater's tenth studio album, Black Clouds & Silver Linings, the band's second under Roadrunner Records; was released on June 23, 2009.

In September 2010, founding drummer Mike Portnoy announced that he was leaving the band. The band filmed a documentary ("The Spirit Carries On") of their search for a replacement who they found in Berklee professor Mike Mangini. In 2011, Dream Theater released their eleventh studio album A Dramatic Turn of Events and its eponymous album in 2013, their first album featuring composition from him. The band released their eleventh music video for "On the Backs of Angels" on October 4, 2011, a song which was subsequently nominated for a Grammy award.

On December 6, 2013, it was announced that the lead single from Dream Theater's self-titled album, "The Enemy Inside" was nominated for the Best Metal Performance Grammy Award. This is the band's second consecutive Grammy nomination. The band's thirteenth studio album, The Astonishing, was released in January 2016. It was followed with the release of their fourteenth studio album, Distance over Time, in February 2019.

On November 27, 2020, Dream Theater released their ninth live album, Distant Memories - Live in London. This was soon followed by the release of their 15th studio album, A View from the Top of the World, which won the band their first Grammy with its lead single, "The Alien."

Dream Theater has sold over two million records and DVDs in the United States and over 12 million records and DVDs throughout the world.

Albums

Studio albums

Live albums

Compilation albums

Extended plays

Singles

Main singles

 A^ - Record Store Day exclusive.
 B^ - Released on December 1, 2020, for the help of the touring crew of Dream Theater because of the COVID-19 pandemic.

Promotional singles

Other appearances

Videos

Video albums

Music videos

Fanclub releases

Official bootlegs

See also
List of Dream Theater songs

References
General

Specific

External links
 Dream Theater discography at their official website
 
 

Heavy metal group discographies
Discographies of American artists